Krasnorechenka is a rural locality (a selo) and the administrative center of Krasnorechenskoye Rural Settlement, Gribanovsky District, Voronezh Oblast, Russia. The population was 373 as of 2010. There are 5 streets.

Geography 
Krasnorechenka is located 58 km west of Gribanovsky (the district's administrative centre) by road. Podgornoye is the nearest rural locality.

References 

Rural localities in Gribanovsky District